The Southland Sharks are a New Zealand basketball team based in Invercargill. The Sharks compete in the National Basketball League (NBL) and play their home games at Stadium Southland. For sponsorship reasons, they are known as the SBS Bank Southland Sharks.

Team history
The Southland Sharks brand dates back to the 1990s when the Smokefree Southland Sharks competed in the Conference Basketball League (CBL) and won championships in 1995 and 1998. In 2002, a group of local businessmen launched a bid to enter a Southland team into the National Basketball League (NBL), but that attempt fell over late in the piece when the Community Trust of Southland declined a $150,000 application.

In October 2009, Southland Basketball Association was granted a three-year NBL license. In December 2009, the Sharks were confirmed for the 2010 NBL season.

The Sharks made playoff appearances in their first two seasons in the NBL, before missing the post-season in 2012. In 2013, the Sharks won their maiden NBL championship with a 92–81 win over the Nelson Giants in the final. After another playoff appearance in 2014, the Sharks won their first minor premiership in 2015, before going on to reach the NBL final, where they won their second championship with a 72–68 win over the Wellington Saints. With the win, they broke the 2001 Waikato Titans 15-game winning streak to finish the season with 16 wins in a row. The 2015 season also saw the Sharks retire Kevin Braswell's No. 12 jersey.

After another playoff appearance in 2016, the Sharks made their third NBL final in 2017, where they lost 108–75 to the Saints. In 2018, the Sharks returned to the NBL final for the fourth time in six years, where they won their third championship with a 98–96 win over the Saints.

The Sharks sat out the 2020 season due to the COVID-19 pandemic.

In 2022, the Sharks' inaugural sponsors SIT Zero Fees decided to end its long-term partnership with the team.

Honour roll

Players

Current roster

Notable past players 

  Larry Abney
  Everard Bartlett
  Todd Blanchfield
  Craig Bradshaw
  Kevin Braswell
  Brian Conklin
  Gareth Dawson
  /  Mark Dickel
  Kaniel Dickens
  Mike Helms
  Paul Henare
  Leon Henry
  /  Martin Iti
  Jordair Jett
  Nick Kay
  /  Adrian Majstrovich
  /  Luke Martin
  Daniel Munday
  Mitch Norton
  James Paringatai
  Alex Pledger
  Brendon Polyblank
  /  Dion Prewster
  Mike Rose
  René Rougeau
  Reuben Te Rangi
  /  Arthur Trousdell
  /  Tai Wesley

References

External links 
 Official team website
 "Southland Sharks: Standing tall among us" at stuff.co.nz
 "Jill Bolger's 40 years of dedication to Southland basketball recognised" at stuff.co.nz

Basketball teams established in 2010
Basketball teams in New Zealand
National Basketball League (New Zealand) teams
2010 establishments in New Zealand